"" is the seventh single by Shiori Takei and released August 30, 2006 under Giza Studio label. The single reached #88 in the first week. It charted for 1 week and sold over 1,518  copies.

Track listing

lyricist: Nana Azuki (Garnet Crow)/composer: Aika Ohno/arranger: Satoru Kobayashi

lyricist: Shiori Takei/composer: Keika/arranger: Hiroshi Asai (The Tambourines)
 live: -Thursday live at Hills bread factory '06.4.20 -
lyricist: Shiori Takei/composer: Kenta Takamori/arranger: Takashi Mazusaki
 (less vocal)

References

2006 singles
2006 songs
Being Inc. singles
Giza Studio singles
Songs written by Aika Ohno
Songs with lyrics by Nana Azuki